Austroblechnum durum, synonym Blechnum durum, is a species of fern in the family Blechnaceae. The fern is endemic to New Zealand.

Description
Thomas Moore described this species as follows:

Taxonomy
This fern was first described by Moore in The Gardeners' Chronicle in 1866 as Lomaria dura. His description was based on a cultivated specimen collected by Henry H. Travers on the Chatham Islands in 1871.

Distribution and habitat
A. durum has a somewhat restricted range in coastal forests from south of Okuru and the Haast River eastward to the Catlins area of the South Island. A. durum also is found on Stewart Island in the mixed hardwood/podocarp forest floor in association with Austroblechnum leyboldtianum, A. lanceolatum and A. colensoi.

References

Blechnaceae
Ferns of New Zealand
Endemic flora of New Zealand
Ferns of Australasia